Élisabeth Bouscaren (born 1956) is a French mathematician who works on algebraic geometry, algebra and mathematical logic (model theory).

Education and career
Bouscaren received her doctorate in 1979 from the University of Paris VII and her habilitation in 1985. From 1981 she worked at the French National Center for Scientific Research (CNRS) until 2005, when she moved to the University of Paris XI. Since 2007, she has held the position of Research Director at CNRS.

She has been a visiting scholar at Yale University, the University of Notre Dame and MSRI, and has published a book on Ehud Hrushovski's proof of the Mordell-Lang conjecture.
She was an invited speaker in the logic session of the 2002 International Congress of Mathematicians.

In 2020, Bouscaren gave the Gödel Lecture, titled The ubiquity of configurations in Model Theory.

Selected publications 

, Séminaire Bourbaki 1999/2000

References

External links 

 Homepage
 CV (pdf)

1956 births
Living people
Women in Red 2018
20th-century French mathematicians
French women mathematicians
University of Paris alumni
Date of birth missing (living people)
Place of birth missing (living people)
Academic staff of Paris-Sud University
French National Centre for Scientific Research scientists
Gödel Lecturers
21st-century French mathematicians